Clematis marmoraria (New Zealand dwarf clematis) is an evergreen plant with parsley-like, leathery and dark green foliage. The white flowers are about 2 cm wide, blooming in early spring.

Habitat
This clematis can be found growing in alpine marble karrenfeld either in crevices in massive marble, or amongst semi-fixed rocks, stones, and similar rocky sites in open herbfield.

References

marmoraria
Flora of New Zealand